Ira S. Webb (May 12, 1899 – December 9, 1971) was an American film producer, set decorator, screenwriter, art director and film director. He won an Academy Award and was nominated for two more in the category Best Art Direction.  He was the brother of "B"-film producer and director Harry S. Webb.

Selected filmography
Webb won an Academy Awards for Best Art Direction and was nominated for two more:

Won
 Phantom of the Opera (1943)

Nominated
 Arabian Nights (1942)
 The Climax (1944)

References

External links

1899 births
1971 deaths
American film producers
American set decorators
American male screenwriters
American art directors
American film directors
Best Art Direction Academy Award winners
20th-century American male writers
20th-century American screenwriters